Olivia Grant (born 20 September 1983) is an English actress. Her first film role was in Stardust (2007), in which she was cast within a couple weeks of graduating from Oxford University. She is perhaps best known for portraying Lady Adelaide Midwinter in BBC's Lark Rise to Candleford, Grace Darling in BBC3's Personal Affairs, Hermione Roddice in Women in Love, Henrietta Armistead in Garrow's Law, Ava Knox in the HBO/Cinemax co-production Strike Back and Madeleine Mathers in Indian Summers for PBS and Channel 4.

Early life and career
Grant was born on 20 September 1983 in southwest London, to Irene Whilton, a costume designer, and Kenneth Grant, a district judge. She was trained in classical ballet and was awarded a place as a Junior Associate of the Royal Ballet School at the age of 10 and she performed with The Royal Ballet at Covent Garden Opera House and the Birmingham Royal Ballet at Sadler's Wells.
   
Grant then obtained a place at St Paul's Girls' School where she combined her studies with extra-curricular performing; winning a place as a Junior Associate at the Guildhall School of Music and Drama whilst still at school. At Brasenose College, Oxford University she studied English Literature whilst performing in up to two plays a term in parts such as Isabella in Shakespeare's Measure for Measure, Anna in Patrick Marber's Closer, and Natasha in Chekhov's Three Sisters at the Oxford Playhouse.

In her final year at Oxford she was invited by Royal Shakespeare Company producer Thelma Holt and the Cameron Mackintosh Fund to take part in a showcase at the Old Vic Studios, where her monologue performance of Juliet Stevenson from Anthony Minghella's film script Truly Madly Deeply led to her being contacted by leading acting agents in the run up to her finals.  Within weeks of graduating Grant was cast in the Paramount film Stardust, in a role which saw her magically transformed from a boy to a goat to a girl by an evil witch Lamia (played by Michelle Pfeiffer). During production she rehearsed at Pinewood Studios with cast members Claire Danes and Robert De Niro.

After her role in Stardust, Grant was cast as one of the leads, Lady Adelaide Midwinter, in BBC1's period drama series Lark Rise to Candleford. She spent six months filming in the Wiltshire countryside alongside cast members Dawn French, Julia Sawalha, and Ben Miles. After finishing the first series she was then cast as the lead Grace Darling in the BBC Three comedy-drama series Personal Affairs in which she played a secret lesbian in the script written by Gabbie Asher.

Grant was then cast with Rhys Ifans in the feature film Mr Nice (dir. Bernard Rose). She worked again with director Charlie Palmer on the ITV classic series Poirot with David Suchet, Geoffrey Palmer, and Anna Massey, playing an undercover spy Annabel Larkin. The BBC invited her to reprise her role as Lady Adelaide in Lark Rise to Candleford, which she did for Series 3. She then played with the fellow Oxford alumni Rosamund Pike and Rory Kinnear in BBC Four's production of Women In Love as Hermione Roddice, which was shot in South Africa. Following this, she played the lead role of Sophia in The Picture at the Salisbury Playhouse.

In 2012, Grant played with Rupert Graves as his character's new mistress in the BAFTA-nominated BBC period drama Garrow's Law. She spent the summer filming in Malta on the independent feature film Gozo along with Ophelia Lovibond and appeared in the ITV crime drama series Endeavour as Helen Cartwright. She also returned to South Africa to shoot the Emmy-nominated HBO / Cinemax co-production Strikeback playing Charles Dance's daughter Ava Knox. Other roles that year included Jennifer in the indie feature film Copenhagen, and BBC Worldwide's Cold War television film Legacy which aired in November 2013. She next appeared in Indian Summers, a period drama set during the 1930s British Raj for Channel 4 and PBS that debuted in Spring 2015 in both the UK and US. She then starred in the thriller Breakdown in which she appears alongside Craig Fairbrass, James Cosmo, Bruce Payne and Tamer Hassan. In 2016, she reprised her role as Madeleine Mathers in Indian Summers Series Two, led the film Genesis along with John Hannah and has spent 2016 filming a pilot for NBC Universal called True Fiction and filming the feature film Heidi: Queen of the Mountains along with Bill Nighy and Mark Williams. She also appeared in the series "Crossing Lines" in the episode "The Velvet Glove" first aired on 2nd October 2014

Filmography

References

External links

 
 
 

1983 births
Living people
Actresses from London
English television actresses
English film actresses
20th-century English actresses
21st-century English actresses
People educated at the Royal Ballet School
People educated at St Paul's Girls' School
Alumni of the Guildhall School of Music and Drama
Alumni of Brasenose College, Oxford